Make His Praise Glorious is the tenth studio album by Christian singer Sandi Patti, released in 1988 on Word Records. The track "Almighty God" was nominated for a Grammy for Best Gospel Performance, Female and would win Patti three GMA Dove Awards for Female Vocalist, Inspirational Album and Inspirational Recorded Song of the Year (for "In Heaven's Eyes") at the 20th GMA Dove Awards in 1989. Make His Praise Glorious topped the Billboard Top Christian Albums chart  and it was certified Gold by the Recording Industry Association of America.

Track listing

Personnel 
 Sandi Patti – vocals, rhythm arrangements (1, 2, 5, 7, 9)
 David Huntsinger – acoustic piano, rhythm arrangements (5)
 Phil Naish – keyboards, rhythm arrangements (1, 2, 4, 7, 9)
 Steve Schaffer – Synclavier operator (1, 2, 4)
 Steve Millikan – additional keyboard overdubs (9)
 Jon Goin – guitars (1-7, 9, 10)
 Rex Thomas – additional guitar overdubs (5)
 Mark Baldwin – guitars (8)
 Nathan East – bass (1, 2, 4, 5, 7, 9)
 Craig Nelson – bass (3, 6, 8, 10)
 Paul Leim – drums (1, 2, 4, 5, 7, 9)
 Mark Hammond – drums (3, 6, 8, 10)
 Sam Bacco – percussion 
 Farrell Morris – percussion
 Dan Higgins – horns (7)
 Kim Hutchcroft – horns (7)
 Gary Grant –  horns (7) 
 Jerry Hey – horns (7), horn arrangements (7)
 Mary Alice Hopefinger – harp (1-6, 8, 9, 10)
 The Nashville String Machine – strings (1-6, 8, 9, 10)
 Carl Gorodetzky – string leader (1-6, 8, 9, 10)
 Greg Nelson – rhythm arrangements (1, 2, 4, 5, 7, 9)
 David T. Clydesdale – orchestrations and conductor (1, 3, 6, 8, 10), arrangements (3, 6, 8, 10)
 Alan Moore – string arrangements (2, 4, 5, 9)

Brass and Woodwinds
 Virginia Lee Carroll, Cynthia Estill, Pat Gunter, Ann Richards, Buddy Skipper and Bobby Taylor – woodwind section 
 Ernie Collins, Dennis Good, Barry Green, Chris McDonald, Gary Armstrong, Jeff Bailey, Paul Butcher, Mike Haynes, John Rommel, George Tidwell, Ralph Childs, Michael Buckwalter, Robert Heuer, Barbara Hutchins, Tom McAninch, Eberhard Ramm and Rick Ricker – brass section

Backing vocals
 David T. Clydesdale – arrangements (1)
 Alan Moore – arrangements (2, 4, 5, 9)
 David Maddux – arrangements (7)
 Corliss Nelson – vocal conductor (1, 3, 6)
 Beverly Darnall – vocal contractor (1, 3, 6)
 Cozette Byrd – vocal contractor (8)
Singers
 Mary Bates (1, 3, 6)
 Sheldon "Butch" Curry (1, 3, 6)
 Beverly Darnall (1, 3, 6, 8)
 John Darnall (1, 3, 6, 8)
 Bobby James (1, 3, 6)
 Tammy Jensen (1, 3, 6)
 Bonnie Keen (1, 2, 3, 5-7)
 David Maddux (1, 2, 3, 5-7)
 Marty McCall (1, 2, 3, 5-7)
 Ellen Musick (1, 3, 6)
 Gary Musick (1, 3, 6)
 Guy Penrod (1, 3, 6)
 Gary Robinson (1, 3, 6, 8)
 Leah Taylor (1, 3, 6, 8)
 Melodie Tunney (1, 2, 3, 5-7)
 Lizbeth Wendt (1, 3, 6)
 Gary Janney (2, 5, 7)
 Sandi Patti (2, 5, 7, 8)
 Tammy Boyer (8)
 Shelley Harris (8)
 Leah Helvering (8)
 Brent Henderson (8)
 Greg McCaw (8)
 Don Peslis (8)
 Steve Taylor (8)

Production 
 John Helvering – executive producer 
 Greg Nelson – producer 
 Sandi Patti – producer 
 Ed Seay – engineer 
 John Bolt – additional engineer 
 Bob Clark – additional engineer 
 Kevin Clark – additional engineer 
 Joe Neil – additional engineer 
 Jim Scheffler – additional engineer 
 Mark Aspinall – assistant engineer 
 David Murphy – assistant engineer 
 Mike Poole – assistant engineer 
 Georgetown Masters (Nashville, Tennessee) – mastering location 
 Cindy Wilt – production manager 
 Brian Jannsen – production assistant 
 Amy Yahnig – production assistant 
 Camille Engel Advertising – art direction, design 
 Rich Voorhees – photography

Charts

Radio singles

Certifications and sales

Accolades
GMA Dove Awards
1989 Female Vocalist of the Year

References

1988 albums
Sandi Patty albums
Word Records albums